Pouteria longifolia is a species of plant in the family Sapotaceae. It is found in Bolivia and Peru.

References

longifolia
Vulnerable plants
Trees of Peru
Taxonomy articles created by Polbot